The canton of Chazelles-sur-Lyon is a French former administrative division located in the department of Loire. It was disbanded following the French canton reorganisation which came into effect in March 2015. It consisted of 10 communes, which joined the canton of Feurs in 2015. It had 10,859 inhabitants (2012).

The canton comprised the following communes:

Châtelus
Chazelles-sur-Lyon
Chevrières
La Gimond
Grammond
Maringes
Saint-Denis-sur-Coise
Saint-Médard-en-Forez
Viricelles
Virigneux

See also
Cantons of the Loire department

References

Former cantons of Loire (department)
2015 disestablishments in France
States and territories disestablished in 2015